KYYA (730 AM) is a radio station licensed to Billings, Montana, United States. The station serves the Billings area. The station is currently owned by Desert Mountain Broadcasting. These call letters previously belonged to FM 93.3 which aired an Adult AC Format for many years until FM 93.3 went silent and was later sold to another radio broadcaster in the Billings radio market. 730 AM is a Canadian and Mexican clear-channel frequency.

On May 7, 2019, Connoisseur Media announced that it would sell its Billings cluster to Desert Mountain Broadcasting, an entity formed by Connoisseur Billings general manager Cam Maxwell. The sale closed on July 31, 2019.

On November 27, 2019, KYYA dropped its news/talk format and began stunting with Christmas music as "Billings' Christmas Station" (simulcasting on FM translator K251CI 98.1 FM Billings).

On December 26, 2019, KYYA ended its Christmas music stunt and launched an oldies format, branded as "98.1 K-Bear".

Previous logo

References

External links
KYYA Website

FCC History Cards for KYYA

YYA
Radio stations established in 1959
1995 establishments in Montana
Oldies radio stations in the United States